The Farmer Baronetcy, of Mount Pleasant in the County of Sussex, was a title in the Baronetage of Great Britain. It was created on 19 January 1780 for George Farmer, in honour of his late father, Captain George Farmer, who was killed when commanding  in a naval battle with superior French forces off Ushant. The title became extinct on the death of the fifth Baronet in 1913.

Farmer baronets, of Mount Pleasant (1780)
Sir George William Farmer, 1st Baronet (–1814)
Sir George Richard Farmer, 2nd Baronet (1788–1855)
Sir George Farmer, 3rd Baronet (1829–1883)
Sir George Richard Hugh Farmer, 4th Baronet (1873–1891)
Sir Richard Harry Kenrick Farmer, 5th Baronet (1841–1913), married on 1878 Jane, daughter of Robert Smyth. And had issue:
Ethel
Mary
Gladys
Florence

References

Extinct baronetcies in the Baronetage of Great Britain